Rohlfs is the surname of
Anna Katharine Rohlfs (Green) (1846-1935), American author
Charles Rohlfs (1853-1936), American furniture artist
Christian Rohlfs (1849-1938), German artist
Eva Ahnert-Rohlfs (1912-1954), German astronomer
Ewald Rohlfs (1911-?), German testpilot 
Friedrich Gerhard Rohlfs (1831-1896), German explorer (Africa)
Gerhard Rohlfs (1892-1986), German linguist, researcher of Italian and other Romance languages
Kristen Rohlfs (1930–2017), German astro-physicist
Nicolaus Rohlfs, (18th century) German astronomer
Roland Rohlfs (1892-1974), American testpilot